Phillip Francis Housley (born March 9, 1964) is an American professional ice hockey coach and former player. He most recently served an assistant coach for the Arizona Coyotes of the National Hockey League (NHL) from 2019 to 2022. Housley was the head coach of the NHL's Buffalo Sabres from 2017 until 2019.

Playing as a defenseman, Housley was drafted by the Sabres in the first round of the 1982 NHL Entry Draft and had a long and illustrious career playing for the Sabres, Winnipeg Jets, St. Louis Blues, Calgary Flames, New Jersey Devils, Washington Capitals, Chicago Blackhawks, and Toronto Maple Leafs. As a player, Housley was inducted into the Hockey Hall of Fame in 2015.

Playing career
Housley is the second leading scorer amongst American-born players, with 1,232 points (338–894). He held the record for most points by an American-born NHL player until Mike Modano surpassed it on November 7, 2007.

Housley never won the Stanley Cup, coming closest with the Capitals in 1998, where they were swept in the Stanley Cup Finals by the Detroit Red Wings. At the time of retirement, Housley had played more NHL games without winning the Stanley Cup than any other player in NHL history until the retirement of Shane Doan in 2017, Jarome Iginla in 2018 and Patrick Marleau in 2022.

On January 21, 2000, Housley played in his 1,257th NHL game, the most ever at the time by an American, breaking the record held by Craig Ludwig. Housley went on to play in 1,495 NHL games. He held the record for games played by an American-born player for nearly seven years, until it was broken, on November 24, 2006, by Chris Chelios.

Housley was inducted into the United States Hockey Hall of Fame in 2004, and was inducted into the Hockey Hall of Fame on November 9, 2015. On February 7, 2007, he was inducted into the Buffalo Sabres Hall of Fame, commemorated in a pre-game ceremony with former head coach Scotty Bowman on hand.

Coaching career
From 2004 to 2013, Housley coached high school hockey at Stillwater Area High School in Stillwater, Minnesota, helping to rebuild the program to respectability. From 2013 to 2017, Housley was an assistant coach for the Nashville Predators, working primarily with defensemen.

On January 5, 2013, Housley coached Team USA to the gold medal at the 2013 IIHF World U20 Championship in Ufa, Russia. He had served as an assistant coach on Team USA's 2007 and 2011 appearances in the World Juniors.

On June 15, 2017, it was announced that Housley was hired by the Buffalo Sabres as their new head coach. He led the Sabres to a 31st-place finish in his first season and saw the Sabres attain a 10-game winning streak early in his second season before the team collapsed down the stretch. Housley was fired by the Sabres after the 2018–19 season on April 7, 2019.

On June 26, 2019, it was announced that Housley signed a multi-year contract as assistant coach for the Arizona Coyotes. For the Coyotes, Housley serves as defensive coordinator and power play coach.<p>

With his contract set to expire, Housley and the Coyotes agreed to part ways on May 1, 2022.

Personal life
Housley grew up in South St. Paul, Minnesota. He is married to his high school sweetheart, Karin Housley, a Minnesota state senator. The Housleys have four grown children and reside in St. Marys Point, Minnesota.

Career playing statistics

Regular season and playoffs

International

Head coaching record

Awards and achievements
Member of the United States Hockey Hall of Fame (2004)
NHL All-Rookie Team (1983)
NHL Second All-Star Team (1992)
Played in NHL All-Star Game (1984, 1989, 1990, 1991, 1992, 1993, 2000)
Second runner-up Norris Trophy (1992)
Inducted into the Hockey Hall of Fame (2015)
Youngest Defencemen in NHL History to Score (30) Goals in a Single Season @ (20 Years/9 Days) in Edmonton on 03/18/1984 in a 4-3 loss to the Oilers.

International play
1984 Canada Cup (fourth place)
1987 Canada Cup (fifth place)
1996 World Cup of Hockey (first place)
Ice Hockey World Championships: 1982 (eight place), 1986 (sixth place), 1989 (sixth place), 2000 (fifth place), 2001 (fourth place), 2003 (13th place)
IIHF World U20 Championship: 2013 (Head Coach - Gold Medal)
2013 Men's World Ice Hockey Championships (Assistant Coach- Bronze Medal)

Transactions
June 7, 1982 - Buffalo Sabres 1st round draft choice (6th overall) in the 1982 NHL Entry Draft.
June 16, 1990 - Traded by the Buffalo Sabres, along with Scott Arniel, Jeff Parker and Buffalo's 1990 1st round choice (Keith Tkachuk), to the Winnipeg Jets in exchange for Dale Hawerchuk and Winnipeg's 1990 1st round draft choice (Brad May).
September 23, 1993 - Traded by the Winnipeg Jets to the St. Louis Blues in exchange for Nelson Emerson and Stéphane Quintal.
July 4, 1994 - Traded by the St. Louis Blues, along with St. Louis' 1996 2nd round draft choice (Steve Bégin) and St. Louis' 1997 2nd round draft choice (John Tripp), to the Calgary Flames in exchange for Al MacInnis and Calgary's 1997 4th round draft choice.
February 26, 1996 - Traded by the Calgary Flames, along with Dan Keczmer, to the New Jersey Devils in exchange for Tommy Albelin, Cale Hulse and Jocelyn Lemieux.
July 22, 1996 - Signed as a free agent with the Washington Capitals
September 28, 2001 - Claimed on waivers by the Chicago Blackhawks from the Calgary Flames
March 11, 2003 - Traded by the Chicago Blackhawks to the Toronto Maple Leafs in exchange for Toronto's 2003 9th round draft choice (Chris Porter) and Toronto's 2004 4th round draft choice (Karel Hromas).

See also
 List of members of the United States Hockey Hall of Fame
 List of NHL statistical leaders
 List of NHL players with 1000 games played
 List of NHL players with 1000 points

References

External links
 
 Phil Housley's U.S. Olympic Team bio

1964 births
Living people
American men's ice hockey defensemen
Buffalo Sabres draft picks
Buffalo Sabres coaches
Buffalo Sabres players
Calgary Flames players
Chicago Blackhawks players
Hockey Hall of Fame inductees
Ice hockey coaches from Minnesota
Ice hockey players at the 2002 Winter Olympics
IIHF Hall of Fame inductees
Lester Patrick Trophy recipients
Medalists at the 2002 Winter Olympics
Nashville Predators coaches
National Hockey League All-Stars
National Hockey League first-round draft picks
New Jersey Devils players
Olympic silver medalists for the United States in ice hockey
Sportspeople from Saint Paul, Minnesota
St. Louis Blues players
St. Paul Vulcans players
Toronto Maple Leafs players
United States Hockey Hall of Fame inductees
Washington Capitals players
Winnipeg Jets (1979–1996) players
Ice hockey people from Saint Paul, Minnesota